Visayans (Visayan: mga Bisaya) or Visayan people are a Philippine ethnolinguistic group or metaethnicity native to the Visayas, the southernmost islands of Luzon and a significant portion of Mindanao. When taken as a single ethnic group, they are both the most numerous in the entire country at around 33.5 million, as well as the most geographically widespread. The Visayans broadly share a maritime culture with strong Roman Catholic traditions integrated into a precolonial indigenous core through centuries of interaction and migration mainly across the Visayan, Sibuyan, Camotes, Bohol and Sulu seas. In more inland or otherwise secluded areas, ancient animistic-polytheistic beliefs and traditions either were reinterpreted within a Roman Catholic framework or syncretized with the new religion. Visayans are generally speakers of one or more of the Bisayan languages, the most widely spoken being Cebuano, followed by Hiligaynon (Ilonggo) and Waray-Waray.

Terminology
Kabisay-an refers both to the Visayan people collectively and the islands they have inhabited since prehistory. The Anglicized term Visayas (in turn adapted from the Hispanized Bisayas) is commonly used to refer to the latter.

In Northern Mindanao, Visayans (both Mindanao natives and migrants) are also referred to by the Lumad as the dumagat ("sea people", from the root word dagat - "sea"; not to be confused with the Dumagat Aeta). This was to distinguish the coast-dwelling Visayans from the Lumad of the interior highlands and marshlands.

The following regions and provinces in the Philippines have a sizeable or predominant Visayan population:

According to H. Otley Beyer and other anthropologists, the term Visayan (Spanish: bisayo) was first applied only to the people of Panay and to their settlements eastward in the island of Negros and northward in the smaller islands, which now compose the province of Romblon. In fact, at the early part of Spanish colonialization of the Philippines, the Spaniards used the term Visayan only for these areas, while the people of Cebu, Bohol and Western Leyte were for a long time known only as Pintados. 

The name Visayan was later extended to them around the beginning of 1800s because, as several of the early writers state (especially in the writings of the Jesuit Lorenzo Hervás y Panduro published in 1801), albeit erroneously, their languages are closely allied to the Visayan "dialect" of Panay. The impression of these similarities was in fact carefully analyzed by David Zorc, who, while able to linguistically classify the Austronesian subfamily termed Bisayan languages, noticed their overall connections as one dialect continuum. These should not, however, be confused as dialects, given the lack of mutual intelligibility.

Grabiel Ribera, captain of the Spanish royal infantry in the Philippine Islands, also distinguished Panay from the rest of the Pintados Islands. In his report (dated March 20, 1579) regarding a campaign to pacify the natives living along the rivers of Mindanao (a mission he received from Dr. Francisco de Sande, Governor and Captain-General of the Archipelago), Ribera mentioned that his aim was to make the inhabitants of that island "vassals of King Don Felipe ... as are all the natives of the island of Panay, the Pintados Islands, and those of the island of Luzon ..."

Similarly, the old Spanish term Hiligueinos (also spelled Yliguenes, Yligueynes, or Hiligueynos; from Visayan Iligan or Iliganon, meaning "people of the coast") was once used by the Spanish conquistador Miguel de Loarca as a general name for coastal-dwelling Visayans not only in Panay, but also Cebu, Bohol, and Western Negros. Today, the demonym is only used specifically for the Hiligaynon people, a major Visayan subgroup.

History

Classical period

The Visayans first encountered Western Civilization when Portuguese explorer Ferdinand Magellan reached the island of Homonhon, Eastern Samar in 1521. The Visayas became part of the Spanish colony of the Philippines and the history of the Visayans became  intertwined with the history of the Philippines. With the three centuries of contact with the Spanish Empire via Mexico and the United States, the islands today share a culture tied to the sea later developed from an admixture of indigenous lowland Visayans, Han Chinese, Indian, and American influences.

Spanish colonization

The first Filipino people encountered by the Magellan expedition (c. 1521) were Visayans from the island of Suluan; followed by two rulers of the Surigaonon and Butuanon people on a hunting expedition in Limasawa, Rajah Colambu and Rahah Siaui; and finally Rajah Humabon of Cebu. Magellan describes the Suluanon people he encountered as "painted" (tattooed), with gold earrings and armlets, and kerchiefs around their heads. They described Rajah Colambu as having dark hair that hung down to his shoulders, tawny skin, and tattoos all throughout his body. They also noted the large amount of gold ornaments he wore, from large gold earrings to gold tooth fillings. Rajah Colambu wore embroidered patadyong that covered him from the waist to the knees, as well as a kerchief around his head. They also described the "boloto" (bangka) and the large "balanghai" (balangay) warships, and the custom of drinking palm wine ("uraka") and chewing areca nut. They also described the queen of Cebu as being young and beautiful and covered in white and black cloth. She painted her lips and nails red, and wore a large disc-shaped hat (sadok) made from elaborately-woven leaves.

The 16th century marks the beginning of the Christianization of the Visayan people, with the baptism of Rajah Humabon and about 800 native Cebuanos. The Christianization of the Visayans and Filipinos in general, is commemorated by the Ati-Atihan Festival of Aklan, the Dinagyang Festival of Iloilo, and the Sinulog festival the feast of the Santo Niño de Cebu (Holy Child of Cebu), the brown-skinned depiction of the Child Jesus given by Magellan to Rajah Humabon's wife, Hara Amihan (baptized as Queen Juana). By the 17th century, Visayans already took part in religious missions. In 1672, Pedro Calungsod, a teenage indigenous Visayan catechist and Diego Luis de San Vitores, a Spanish friar, were both martyred in Guam during their mission to preach Christianity to the Chamorro people.

By the end of the 19th century, the Spanish Empire weakened after a series of wars with its American territories. The surge of newer ideas from the outside world thanks to the liberalization of trade by the Bourbon Spain fostered a relatively larger middle class population called the Ilustrados or "the Enlightened Ones." This then became an incentive for the new generation of educated political visionaries to fulfill their dreams of independence from three centuries of colonial rule. Some prominent leaders of the Philippine Revolution in the late 19th century were Visayans. Among leaders of the Propaganda movement was Graciano López Jaena, the Ilonggo who established the propagandist publication La Solidaridad (The Solidarity). In the Visayan theater of the Revolution, Pantaleón Villegas (better known as León Kilat) led the Cebuano revolution in the Battle of Tres de Abril (April 3). One of his successors, Arcadio Maxilom, is a prominent general in the liberalization of Cebu. Earlier in 1897, Aklan fought against the Spaniards with Francisco Castillo and Candido Iban at the helm. Both were executed after a failed offensive. Martin Delgado led the rebellion in neighboring Iloilo. Led by Juan Araneta with the assistance of Aniceto Lacson, Negros Occidental was freed while Negros Oriental was liberated by Diego de la Viña. The former would be called the Negros Revolution or the Cinco de Noviembre. Movements in Capiz were led by Esteban Contreras with the aid of Alejandro Balgos, Santiago Bellosillo and other Ilustrados. Meanwhile, Leandro Locsin Fullon spearheaded the liberalization of Antique. Most of these revolutionaries would continue their fight for independence until the Philippine–American War. There was also a less heard and short-lived uprising called the Igbaong Revolt which occurred in Igbaong, Antique steered by Maximo and Gregorio Palmero. This revolt, however, was secularly-motivated as they clamored for a more syncretic form of religion based on Visayan animist traditions and Christianity.

Federal State of the Visayas

At the peak of the Philippine Revolution, anti-colonial insurgencies sprung from Luzon up to the Visayas. Despite military support from the Tagalog Republic led by Emilio Aguinaldo, Visayan revolutionary leaders were skeptical toward the real motives of the Tagalogs. Such ethnic animosity was notable to the point that local Visayan leaders demanded forces sent from the north to surrender their armaments and were prohibited to leave revolutionary bases. Moreover, this apprehension led to the full declaration of the Federal State of Visayas on December 12, 1898. This short-lived federal government, based in Iloilo, was an accumulation of revolutionary movements across Panay and Negros. The following were the elected officials four days prior to the declaration:

The federation was immediately formed upon the merger of the Cantonal Government of Negros, the Cantonal Government of Bohol and the Provisional Government of the District of Visayas (based in Panay) which included Romblon. It was said to be based on American federalism and Swiss confederacy. Despite their skepticism towards Malolos, the Visayan government proclaimed its loyalty to the Luzon-based republic while maintaining their own governance, tax collection and army. Apolinario Mabini, then the prime minister of the Malolos republic convinced the Visayan leaders that the Malolos Constitution was only provisional and that the governments in Visayas and Mindanao were promised the power to co-ratify it.

American colonization

After the 1898 Treaty of Paris, the American colonial government saw the integral part of indigenous elites particularly in Negros in local affairs. This was a different move compared to the previous Spanish imperialists who created a racial distinction between mestizos and native Austronesians (indios). As such, this paved the way for a homogenous concept of a Filipino albeit initially based on financial and political power. These said elites were the hacienderos or the landed, bourgeois-capitalist class concentrated within the sugar cane industry of Negros. The Americans' belief that these hacienderos would be strategic elements in their political hold within the newly acquired colony bolstered the drafting of a separate colonial constitution by and for the sugar industry elites. This constitution likewise established the Negros Cantonal Government. This ensured that the island of Negros would be governed by an indigenous civilian government in contrast to the rest of colonist-controlled areas governed by the American-dominated Philippine Commission.

During this period, the eastern islands of Samar, Leyte and Biliran (including Marinduque) were directly governed by the Malolos Republic through Vicente Lukban and later by Ambrosio Mojica. Meanwhile, prior to the full abolition of the federal government on November 12, 1899, Emilio Aguinaldo appointed Martin Delgado as the civil and military governor of Iloilo on April 28, 1899, upon American invasion of Antique. The federal government, much to its rejection of the Cebuano leaders who supported the Katipunan cause, was dissolved upon the Iloilo leaders' voluntary union with the newly formed First Philippine Republic. Other factors which led to Aguinaldo forcing the Visayans to dissolve their government was due to the federation's resistance from reorganizing its army and forwarding taxes to Malolos.

Contemporary

Since Philippine independence from the United States, there have been four Philippine Presidents from the Visayan regions: the Cebuano Sergio Osmeña, the Capiznon Manuel Roxas, the Boholano Carlos P. García, and the Davaoeño Rodrigo Duterte.

In addition, the Visayas has produced three Vice-Presidents, four Senate Presidents, eight Speakers of the House, six Chief Justices, and five Presidential Spouses including Imelda Marcos, a Waray. The then-president Gloria Macapagal Arroyo is also half Cebuano. Former president Rodrigo Duterte, who is of Visayan ethnicity, also has Leyteño roots. In international diplomacy the Visayas has produced a United Nations Undersecretary general, the Negros Occidental native Rafael M. Salas who served as the Head of the UNFPA. In the lines of religion, there have been two Visayan Cardinals, namely Julio Rosales from Samar and Jaime Sin from Aklan. The first Visayan and second Filipino that was canonized is Pedro Calungsod.

Throughout centuries, non-Visayan groups, most notably foreigners such as the Chinese, have settled in predominantly-Visayan cities in Visayas like Iloilo, Bacolod, Dumaguete and Cebu and Mindanao such as Cagayan de Oro, Iligan, Davao and General Santos. These Filipino-Chinese have been assimilated to mainstream society. One factor would be the limited number of Chinese schools in the Visayas which help maintain the Chinese identity and a stronger sense of a distinct community. Many of them, particularly the younger generation, have been de-cultured from Chinese traditions, share values about family and friends with other Filipinos, and do not write or speak Chinese well.
Mexicans, Spaniards and Frenchmen were also settlers in the Visayas and can be found in the Visayan provinces of Negros, Cebu, Leyte and Iloilo.

Meanwhile, Negritos, locally called Ati, have also been assimilated into mainstream Visayan society.

Visayans have likewise migrated to other parts of the Philippines, especially Metro Manila and Mindanao. The Visayans have also followed the pattern of migration of Filipinos abroad and some have migrated to other parts of the world starting from the Spanish and American period and after World War II. Most are migrants or working as overseas contract workers.

Language

Ethnic Visayans predominantly speak at least one of the Bisayan languages, most of which are commonly referred as Binisaya or Bisaya. The table below lists the Philippine languages classified as Bisayan languages by the Summer Institute of Linguistics. Although all of the languages indicated below are classified as "Bisayan" by linguistic terminology, not all speakers identify themselves as ethnically or culturally Visayan. The Tausūg, a Moro ethnic group, only use Bisaya to refer to the predominantly Christian lowland natives which Visayans are popularly recognized as. This is a similar case to the Ati, who delineate Visayans from fellow Negritos. Conversely, the Visayans of Capul in Northern Samar speak Abaknon, a Sama–Bajaw language, as their native tongue.

Culture

Tattoo

Like most other pre-colonial ethnic groups in the Philippines and other Austronesian groups, tattooing was widespread among Visayans. The original Spanish name for the Visayans, Los Pintados ("The Painted Ones") was a reference to the tattoos of the Visayans. Antonio Pigafetta of the Magellan expedition (c. 1521) repeatedly describes the Visayans they encountered as "painted all over".

Native Austronesian tattooing traditions were lost as Visayans converted to Christianity in the last few centuries. It is unclear whether the related Tausug people, who are a subset of southern Visayans who Islamized from the 13th century, had tattooing as a custom before they took up Islam. Today, traditional tattooing among Visayans only survives among some of the older members of the Sulodnon people of the interior highlands of Panay, the descendants of ancient Visayans who escaped Spanish conversion.

Tattoos were known as batuk (or batok) or patik among Visayans. These terms were also applied to identical designs used in woven textiles, pottery, and other decorations. Tattooed people were known generally as binatakan (also known to the Tagalog people as batikan, which also means "renowned" or "skilled"). Both sexes had tattoos. They were symbols of tribal identity and kinship, as well as bravery, beauty, and social status. It was expected of adults to have them, with the exception of the asog (feminized men) for whom it was socially acceptable to be mapuraw or puraw (unmarked). Tattoos were so highly regarded that men will often just wear a loincloth (bahag) to show them off.

The Visayan language itself had various terminologies relating to tattoos like kulmat ("to show off new tattoos) and hundawas ("to bare the chest and show off tattoos for bravado"). Men who were tattooed but have not participated in battles were scorned as halo (monitor lizard), in the sense of being tattooed but undeserving. Baug or binogok referred to the healing period after being tattooed. Lusak ("mud") refers to tattoos that had damaged designs due to infection. Famous heroes covered in tattoos were known as lipong.

Tattoos are acquired gradually over the years, and patterns can take months to complete and heal. They were made by skilled artists using the distinctively Austronesian hafted tattooing technique. This involves using a small hammer to tap the tattooing needle (one or several) set perpendicularly on a wooden handle in an L-shape (hence "hafted"). The ink was made from soot or ashes and water or plant extracts (like those from Cayratia trifolia) and was known as biro. The tattooing process were sacred events that required chicken or pig sacrifices to the ancestor spirits (diwata). Artists were usually paid with livestock, heirloom beads, or precious metals.

The first tattoos were acquired during the initiation into adulthood. They are initially made on the ankles, gradually moving up to the legs and finally the waist. These tattoos were known as hinawak ("of the waist"). These were done on all men, and did not indicate special status. Tattoos on the upper body, however, were only done after notable feats (including in love) and after participation in battles. Once the chest and throat are covered, tattoos are further applied to the back. Tattoos on the chin and face (reaching up to the eyelids) are restricted to the most elite warriors. These face tattoos are called bangut ("muzzle") or langi ("gaping [jaws/beaks]") and are often designed to resemble frightening masks. They may also be further augmented with scarification (labong) burned into the arms. Women were tattooed only on the hands in very fine and intricate designs resembling damask embroidery.

Tattoo designs varied by region. They can be repeating geometric designs, stylized representations of animals (like snakes and lizards), and floral or sun-like patterns. The most basic design was the labid, which was an inch-wide continuous tattoo that covered the legs to the waist in straight or zigzagging lines. Shoulder tattoos were known as ablay; chest tattoos up to the throat were known as dubdub; and arm tattoos were known as daya-daya (also tagur in Panay).

Other body modifications
In addition to tattoos, Visayans also had other body modifications. These include artificial cranial deformation, in which the forehead of infants was pressed against a comb-like device called tangad. The ideal skull shape for adults was for the forehead to slope backwards with a more elongated back part of the skull. Adults with skulls shaped this way were known as tinangad, in contrast with those of unshaped skulls called ondo. Men were also circumcised (more accurately supercised), practiced pearling, or wore pin-shaped genital piercings called tugbuk which was anchored by decorative rivets called sakra. Gold teeth fillings were also common for renowned warriors. Teeth filing and teeth blackening were also practiced.

Religion

Pre-Christianity

Prior to the arrival of Catholicism, precolonial Visayans adhered to a complex Hindu-Buddhist and animist system where spirits in nature were believed to govern all existing life. Similar to other ethnic groups in the Philippines such as the Tagalogs who believed in a pantheon of gods, the Visayans also adhered to deities led by a supreme being. Such belief, on the other hand, was misinterpreted by arriving Spaniards such as Jesuit historian Pedro Chirino to be a form of monotheism. There are Kaptan and Magwayan, supreme god of the sky and goddess of the sea and death, respectively. They in turn bore two children, Lihangin, god of wind, and Lidagat, goddess of the sea. Both aforementioned gods had four children, namely Likabutan, the god of the world, Liadlaw, the god of the sun, Libulan, the god of the moon, and Lisuga, the goddess of the stars. People believed that life transpires amidst the will of and reverence towards gods and spirits. These deities who dwell within nature were collectively called the diwata. Meanwhile, spirits were referred to as umalagad (called anito in Luzon). These refer to ancestors, past leaders or heroes also transfigured within nature. Beside idols symbolizing the umalagad were food, drinks, clothing, precious valuables or even a sacrificial animal offered for protection of life or property. Such practice was a form of ancestor worship. Furthermore, these rituals surrounding the diwata and umalagad were mediated by the babaylan who were highly revered in society as spiritual leaders. These intercessors were equivalent to shamans, and were predominantly women or were required to have strong female attributes such as hermaphrodites and homosexuals. Old men were also allowed to become one. One notable example is Dios Buhawi who ruled a politico-religious revolt in Negros Oriental at the beginning of the Philippine Revolution.

Present-day
According to 2000 survey, 86.53% of the population of Western Visayas professed Roman Catholicism. Aglipayan (4.01%) and Evangelicals (1.48%) were the next largest groups, while 7.71% identified with other religious affiliations.

The same survey showed that 92% of household populations in Central Visayas were Catholics, followed by Aglipayans (2%) and Evangelicals (1%). The remaining 5% belonged to the United Church of Christ in the Philippines, Iglesia ni Cristo, various Protestant denominations or other religions.

For Eastern Visayas, 93% of the total household population were Catholics, while 2% identified as "Aglipayan", and 1% as "Evangelical". The remaining 5% belonged to other Protestant denominations (including the Iglesia ni Cristo, the Seventh-day Adventist Church, and various Baptist churches) or identified with Islam and other religions.

The Tausugs of Sulu do not or identified themselves less as "Bisaya" (Visayan) despite their language being classified as Visayan, owing to their distinct culture and profession of Islamic faith. The Tausug term "bisaya" is only referred to their Christian Visayan neighbors. Tausugs are overwhelmingly Muslims, particularly in their home provinces of Sulu and Tawi-tawi, while those who migrated to and lived in predominantly Christian cities or provinces already professed Catholic Christianity or "Born-Again" Christianity.

Festivals
Visayans are known in the Philippines for their festivities such as the Ati-Atihan, Dinagyang, Pintados-Kasadyaan, Sangyaw, Sinulog festivals. Most Visayan festivals have a strong association with Roman Catholicism despite apparent integration of ancient Hindu-Buddhist-Animist folklore particularly the tradition of dances and the idols in the image of the Child Jesus commonly named as the Santo Niño. The oldest Catholic religious image in the islands still existing today is the Santo Niño de Cebú.

The Sandugo Festival of Tagbilaran, Bohol is a celebration of one of the most significant parts of pre-Philippine history. This festival revolves around the theme of the reenactment of the blood compact between the island's monarch, Datu Sikatuna, and the Spanish explorer, Miguel López de Legazpi, which is known among Filipinos as the Sandugo (lit. unified/one blood). The arrival of the ten Bornean datus as mentioned in the legend of Maragtas is celebrated in Binirayan Festival in Antique.

The MassKara Festival of Bacolod, Negros Occidental explores more on the distinct cultural identity of the city. Since Bacolod is tagged as the City of Smiles due to its fun-loving and enduring people, the city government inaugurated the festival in 1980 after tragedy struck the region.

Literature

Some of the earliest known works were documented by a Spanish Jesuit named Ignacio Francisco Alzina during the Spanish colonial Philippines. Among these literary pieces from ancient Eastern Visayas were candu, haya, ambahan, canogon, bical, balac, siday and awit which are predominantly in Waray. There were also narratives called susmaton and posong. It was also described that theater played a central role in performing poetry, rituals and dances. The Western Visayans also shared nearly the same literary forms with the rest of the islands. Among their pre-Hispanic works were called the bangianay, hurobaton, paktakun, sugidanun and amba. These were all found to be in Old Kinaray-a. Some of the widely known and the only existing literature describing ancient Visayan society are as the Hinilawod and the Maragtas which was in a combination of Kinaray-a and Hiligaynon. The Aginid: Bayok sa Atong Tawarik is an epic retelling a portion of ancient Cebu history where the Chola dynasty minor prince Sri Lumay of Sumatra founded and ruled the Rajahnate of Cebu. It also has accounts of Rajah Humabon and Lapu-Lapu.

It was found by Filipino polymath José Rizal in Antonio de Morga's Sucesos delas islas Filipinas that one of the first known native poet in much of pre-Philippines known to Europeans was a Visayan named Karyapa. During the golden age of native Philippine languages at the onset of Japanese occupation, numerous Visayan names rose to literary prominence. Acclaimed modern Visayan writers in their respective native languages are Marcel Navarra, the father of modern Cebuano literature, Magdalena Jalandoni, Ramon Muzones, Iluminado Lucente, Francisco Alvardo, Eduardo Makabenta, Norberto Romuáldez, Antonio Abad, Augurio Abeto, Diosdado Alesna, Maragtas S. V. Amante, Epifanio Alfafara, Jose Yap, Leoncio P. Deriada, Conrado Norada, Alex Delos Santos, John Iremil Teodoro and Peter Solis Nery.

Don Ramon Roces of Roces Publishing, Inc. is credited for the promulgation of Visayan languages in publications through Hiligaynon and Bisaya.

Cinema, television and theatre

Visayan films, particularly Cebuano-language ones, experienced a boom between the 1940s and the 1970s. In the mid 1940s alone, a total of 50 Visayan productions were completed, while nearly 80 movies were filmed in the following decade. This wave of success has been bolstered by Gloria Sevilla, billed as the "Queen of Visayan Movies", who won the prestigious Best Actress award from the 1969 FAMAS for the film Badlis sa Kinabuhi and the 1974 Gimingaw Ako. Caridad Sanchez, Lorna Mirasol, Chanda Romero, Pilar Pilapil and Suzette Ranillo are some of the industry's veterans who gained recognition from working on Visayan films.

The national film and television industries are also supported by actors who have strong Visayan roots such as Joel Torre, Jackie Lou Blanco, Edu Manzano, Manilyn Reynes, Dwight Gaston, Vina Morales, Sheryl Reyes, and Cesar Montano, who starred in the 1999 biographical film Rizal and multi-awarded 2004 movie Panaghoy sa Suba. Younger actors and actress of Visayan origin or ancestry include Isabel Oli, Kim Chiu, Enrique Gil, Shaina Magdayao, Carla Abellana, Erich Gonzales and Matteo Guidicelli.

Award-winning director Peque Gallaga of Bacolod has garnered acclaim from his most successful movie Oro, Plata, Mata which depicted Negros Island and its people during World War II. Among his other works and contributions are classic Shake, Rattle & Roll horror film series, Scorpio Nights and Batang X.

GMA Network's 2011 period drama teleserye Amaya as well as its 2013 series Indio, featured the politics and culture of ancient and colonial Visayan societies, respectively.

Music

Traditional Visayan folk music were known to many such as Dandansoy originally in Hiligaynon and is now commonly sang in other Bisayan languages. Another, although originally written in Tagalog, is Waray-Waray, which speaks of the common stereotypes and positive characteristics of the Waray people. American jazz singer Eartha Kitt also had a rendition of the song in her live performances. A very popular Filipino Christmas carol Ang Pasko ay Sumapit translated by Levi Celerio to Tagalog was originally a Cebuano song entitled Kasadya Ning Taknaa popularized by Ruben Tagalog.

Contemporary Philippine music was highly influenced and molded through the contributions of many Visayan artists. Many of them are platinum recorder Jose Mari Chan, Pilita Corrales, Dulce, Verni Varga, Susan Fuentes, Jaya and Kuh Ledesma who enjoyed acclaim around the 1960s to the early 1990s. Newer singers are Jed Madela, Sheryn Regis and Sitti Navarro.

Yoyoy Villame, a Boholano, is dubbed as the Father of Filipino novelty songs with his Butsekik as the most popular. Villame often collaborated with fellow singer, Max Surban. Joey Ayala, Grace Nono and Bayang Barrios are some of the front-runners of a branching musical subgenre called Neotraditional which involved traditional Filipino instruments with modern rhythm and melody.

Rock emerged into dominance within the Philippine music scene in the 1980s. Among the bands from Visayas are Urbandub and Junior Kilat. Another subgenre also sprung a few years later called BisRock which is a portmanteau of Bisaya and rock.

Dance
Ethnic dances from the region are common in any traditional Filipino setting. Curacha or kuratsa (not to be confused with the Zamboangueño dish) is a popular Waray dance. Its Cebuano counterparts are kuradang and la berde. There is the liki from Negros Occidental and the well-known tinikling of Leyte. Other Hiligaynon dances are the harito, balitaw, liay, lalong kalong, imbong, inay-inay and binanog.

Visual arts

The only Boholano and the youngest to receive the National Artist of the Philippines award for visual arts is Napoleon Abueva. He is also tagged as the Father of Modern Philippine Sculpture. Among his works are Kaganapan (1953), the Transfiguration (1979) and the 14 Stations of the Cross around the EDSA Shrine. He is also responsible for the sculpture of the Sandugo monument at Tagbilaran City to give homage to his roots.

A renowned figure in architecture is Leandro Locsin of Silay, Negros Occidental. He was proclaimed as National Artist of the Philippines for architecture in 1990. Locsin worked on many of the buildings in many campuses of the University of the Philippines System. He also designed the main building or the Tanghalang Pambansa of the Cultural Center of the Philippines and the Ayala Tower One & Exchange Plaza housing the Philippine Stock Exchange at Makati.

See also
Bisaya (Borneo), a similarly-named ethnic group in Borneo
Pintados
Visayas
Luções
Rajahnate of Cebu
Timawa
Malay world
Bisaya (genus)
Boxer Codex
Tagalog people
Kapampangan people
Ilocano people
Ivatan people
Igorot people
Pangasinan people
Bicolano people
Negrito
Lumad
Moro people

References

External links

Visayan Languages
Visayan
The issues on the use of the word 'Bisaya' by Henry Funtecha, PhD The News Today. August 28, 2009, Iloilo City, Philippines.

Visayan people
Ethnic groups in the Philippines